The Ukrainian Society of the Deaf, abbreviated UTOH or UTOG is a Ukrainian non-governmental organisation responsible for promoting the rights of the deaf community in Ukraine. Its stated goal is to serve as "An organisational association of persons with hearing impairments and providing them with assistance in professional, labour, and social rehabilitation, protection of their legal rights and interests, and confirmation of their status as citizens fully integrated into society."

History 
The Ukrainian Society of the Deaf was founded by a directive of the All-Ukrainian Central Executive Committee on 4 June 1933, alongside the Ukrainian Association of the Blind (UTOS). Joining the World Federation of the Deaf in 1957, UTOH's existence was confirmed by the 5 October 1992 law of the Verkhovna Rada (Ukraine's parliament) "On Citizens' Associations".

During the 2022 Russian invasion of Ukraine, UTOH's activities were significantly impacted. Along with UTOS, local offices of UTOH received aid, including in Mykolaiv and Kostiantynivka.

Activities 
UTOH's primary goal, as described on their website, is to serve as "An organisational association of persons with hearing impairments and providing them with assistance in professional, labour, and social rehabilitation, protection of their legal rights and interests, and confirmation of their status as citizens fully integrated into society." Among their activities are searching for deaf persons who have gone missing as a result of the Russo-Ukrainian War, translation of government information into Ukrainian Sign Language, and teaching of Ukrainian Sign Language.

Recognition 
UTOH has been recognised as critical to protecting and enhancing the rights of the deaf in Ukraine, particularly in the wake of the 2022 Russian invasion of Ukraine. The World Federation of the Deaf launched a donation campaign for UTOH in order to assist with operations during the war.

Since 2018, the Government of Ukraine has supplied funding to UTOH and UTOS.

References 

1933 establishments in Ukraine
Deafness rights organizations
Disability organizations based in Ukraine
Organizations established in 1933